was a Japanese inventor, and assistant to Professor Hidetsugu Yagi at Tohoku Imperial University, where together they invented the Yagi–Uda antenna in 1926.

In February 1926, Yagi and Uda published their first report on the wave projector antenna in a Japanese publication. Yagi applied for patents on the new antenna both in Japan and the United States. His  ("Variable Directional Electric Wave Generating Device") was issued in May 1932 and assigned to the Radio Corporation of America.

References

Sources 
 Scanning the Past: A History of Electrical Engineering from the Past
 The history of amateur radio - 8, see chapter "Yagi-Uda's invention".

20th-century Japanese engineers
20th-century Japanese inventors
1896 births
1976 deaths